Lycaenopsis haraldus, Felder's Hedge Blue, is a butterfly in the family Lycaenidae. It was described by Johan Christian Fabricius in 1787. It is found in the Indomalayan realm.

Subspecies
 Lycaenopsis haraldus haraldus (Thailand, Malay Peninsula, Sumatra, Bangka)
 Lycaenopsis haraldus cornuta (Druce, 1873) (Borneo)
 Lycaenopsis haraldus renonga Riley, 1932 (southern Burma, Thailand)
 Lycaenopsis haraldus annamitica Eliot & Kawazoé, 1983 (southern Vietnam)
 Lycaenopsis haraldus mayaangelae Takanami, 1990 (Belitung)

References

External links
Lycaenopsis at Markku Savela's Lepidoptera and Some Other Life Forms

Lycaenopsis
Butterflies described in 1787